Shahini may refer to:
Shahini, Kermanshah
Shahini, Eslamabad-e Gharb, Kermanshah Province
Shahini, Kurdistan